Casper U. Mortensen (born 14 December 1989) is a Danish handball player for HSV Hamburg and the Danish national team.

He is the younger brother of Danish football player Andreas Ulrich Mortensen.

Career

Ajax København
Casper U. Mortensen won the Danish 1st division with Ajax København and played the Danish Handball League in the following season. He was a starting player in both season.

Fredericia HK
Casper U. Mortensen changed scenery as he joined Fredericia HK in the 2009–2010 season, on a two-year contract. Mortensen was voted player of the year while playing for Fredericia HK.

Viborg HK
Mortensen came to Viborg HK in the 2011–2012 season, where he was given jersey number 20. Mortensen ended a great first season, where he scored 145 goal in 22 matches. This made him number 2 on the top scorer list, making him the league player with the highest scoring average pr match, as he played 6 matches less than other league player due to injuries.

Bjerringbro-Silkeborg
After just one season with Viborg HK, Mortensen joined Bjerringbro-Silkeborg, on a three-year contract, in the 2012–2013 season. He was given jersey number 10. Mortensen played a good first season with Bjerringbro-Silkeborg he showed promising signs. He made his debut in the EHF Champions League, where he made team of the week. He became the top scorer for Bjerringbro-Silkeborg making 61 goals in 12 matches. Bjerringbro-Silkeborg lost the Round of 16 to FC Barcelona, where Mortensen scored 8 goal in Barcelona in the 26–24 loss away.

SønderjyskE
Mortensen joined SønderjyskE in 2014–2015 season, signed a one-year contract. SønderjyskE announced at the end of the season that they did not expect the contract to be renewed.

HSV Hamburg
On 8 June 2015, Casper U. Mortensen was presented as new player for the German club HSV Hamburg, joining the club for the 2015/16 season. Casper U. Mortensen was signed on a three-year contract. HSV Hamburg declared insolvent on 15 January 2016.

TSV Hannover Burgdorf 
After playing the European Championships in Poland with the national team of Denmark in 2016, Mortensen signed a contract with TSV Hannover-Burgdorff for the rest of 2015–2016 season. The contract was extended later until the summer of 2020. The season 2017-2018 went on to be one of the bests in Mortensen career, where he finished the season strong with Hannover-Burgdorf (6th place in the league - best result in history of Hannover) and was crowned with a personal trophy - the topscorer in the Bundesliga with 230 goals in total.

FC Barcelona 
After long negotiations in the spring 2018 between TSV Hannover-Burgdorf and FC Barcelona, a deal was made, and Mortensen was bought of FC Barcelona, where he signed a 3-year contract until the summer of 2021. After 6 months together with his new teammates in Barcelona he finished a strong first half-season in the 2018–2019 season. They had already won multiple titles and Mortensen was named EHF PLAYER OF THE YEAR 2018 by EHF.

Individual awards

Topscorer of the Handball-Bundesliga (HBL): 2018
 EHF Player of the year 2018

References

External links

HSV Hamburg Profile

1989 births
Living people
Danish male handball players
Handball players from Copenhagen
SønderjyskE Håndbold players
FC Barcelona Handbol players
Viborg HK players
Handball-Bundesliga players
Liga ASOBAL players
Expatriate handball players
Danish expatriate sportspeople in Germany
Danish expatriate sportspeople in Spain
Olympic handball players of Denmark
Handball players at the 2016 Summer Olympics
Medalists at the 2016 Summer Olympics
Olympic gold medalists for Denmark
Olympic medalists in handball